Rea Tajiri is a Japanese American video artist, filmmaker, and screenwriter, known for her personal essay film History and Memory: For Akiko and Takashige (1991).

Early life
Tajiri was born in 1958 in Chicago, Illinois. Tajiri's father, Vincent Tajiri, was the founding photo editor for Playboy Magazine. Her uncle, Shinkichi Tajiri, was a prominent sculptor who resided in the Netherlands.

Tajiri attend the California Institute of the Arts (CalArts) where she earned her BFA and MFA degrees in post-studio art. She moved to New York in 1979, where she was involved with The Kitchen art center.

Career 
Tajiri's video art has been included in the 1989, 1991, and 1993 Whitney Biennials. She has also been exhibited at The New Museum for Contemporary Art, The Museum of Modern Art, The Guggenheim Museum, The Walker Art Museum and the Pacific Film Archives. Tajiri is a 2015 recipient of the Pew Fellowship in the Arts.

History and Memory: For Akiko and Takashige (1991) was Tajiri's personal essay documentary about the Japanese American internment. It premiered at the 1991 Whitney Biennial and won the Distinguished Achievement Award from the International Documentary Association. It also was awarded a Special Jury Prize: "New Visions Category" at the San Francisco International Film Festival in 1992, and won "Best Experimental Video," Atlanta Film and Video Festival, 1992. In 1993 she made Yuri Kochiyama: Passion for Justice, a documentary about the Nisei Japanese American human rights activist.  Tajiri co-produced the documentary with Pat Saunders.

She partnered with Japanese Canadian author, Kerri Sakamoto, to write a coming-of-age story about a Japanese American girl in 1970s Chicago, resulting in Strawberry Fields. It was shot in 1994 with funding from CPB, NEA, and ITVS.  The film stars Suzy Nakamura, James Sie, Chris Tashima and Takayo Fischer, and was completed in 1997, screening at the San Francisco International Asian American Film Festival and the Los Angeles Film Festival.  It also was selected to the Venice International Film Festival and won the Grand Prix at the Fukuoka Asian Film Festival.

Tajiri is an Associate Professor in Temple University's Division of Theater where she teaches documentary production. Currently, Tajiri is working on a documentary feature entitled Wisdom Gone Wild, a film which details her sixteen-year journey as a caregiver for her mother who had dementia.

Film characteristics
Metanarrative

Tajiri is credited as being a groundbreaking documentary filmmaker for brilliantly weaving together different narratives, taking from found footage but also her own history and experiences.

Avant-garde Documentary

Directed by Rea Tajiri, '"Strawberry Fields" doesn't follow a straight narrative line. Instead, Tajiri opts for graceful and dreamlike forays into the collective memory of war-era Japanese Americans. By showing the
audience grainy photos and films of a world that Irene can never know, director Tajiri heightens the sense of quest in this enigmatic film." Lynn Voedisch Chicago Sun Times

Techniques

"Tajiri often focuses her inquiry on the representation of Asian-Americans in popular media. In Off Limits (1988), she critiques Hollywood's portrayal of the Vietnam War and Vietnamese people, juxtaposing fragments from Easy Rider with her own text to give voice to a Vietnamese character. In History and Memory (1990), Tajiri examines the construction of history and the manipulation of collective memory through a powerful pastiche of personal reminiscences and mass media images of the internment of Japanese-Americans during World War II." Electronic Art Intermix

History and Memory:

An experimental film which reflects the memory of Tajiri's mother of the war period which she lived in. The plot is displayed through pieces of memory and known family history. Tajiri presents the film in four different parts: Events that happen in front of the camera, events that are restaged, events that are told through the memory of character conversation, and events that are known to have happened but not shown at all. As the narrator of this documentary, Tajiri uses text and verbal communication with her audience in order to enhance the purpose of the memory or images she gives to her audience. Through this film Tajiri has highlighted the absence of Japanese Americans among filmmaking. By upholding whatever deconstructed history and memory she may have of her family's experience, Tajiri is praised for bringing attention to the culture of her family's past. Tajiri is also known to bring attention to a topic by using absence to declare presence. In History and Memory, absent characters share a significant presence since their memory is so vital to the film's message. This ability to highlight a character, topic, or event that is absent without confusion or misunderstanding is difficult to achieve for a filmmaker, but Tajiri certainly succeeds in doing so (Streamas). This documentary ultimately awarded Tajiri with the Distinguished Achievement Award from the International Documentary association and a Special Jury Award from the San Francisco International Film Festival (Dorsey). Tajiri's way of filming is most recognized in History and Memory where she distorts the camera in order to show the recollection of memory.

Strawberry Fields

Strawberry Fields was produced by Open City Films and ITVS. It was first premiered in Europe at the Venice International Film Festival and the film also was the recipient of the Grand Prix at the Fukuoka Asian Film Festival (Dorsey).

Tajiri focuses on the recognition of the Asian American identity in her films, which is different than the Asian American culture. Tajiri goes against societal norms in Strawberry Fields, where protagonist Irene, a third generation Japanese American woman, publicly flaunts her inner rage. In the majority of Tajiri's filmmaking she is constantly bringing attention to societal issues, like in History and Memory, where she highlights Asian Americans, Latinos, or Black people not being able to immerse themselves within the white American population shank.

Legacy

Tajiri has cemented herself as an important filmmaker that warrants a deeper understanding of her work and the contexts in which they exist. Her work is becoming more widely recognized and studied as part of the curriculum in many University's documentary and women's cinema programs. Tajiri has also brought attention to identity within filmmaking, displaying cultural tensions and curiosities in order to educate her audience through the story she is telling within specific films.

Filmography

Director

Hitchcock Trilogy 1987
Off Limits 1988
History and Memory: For Akiko and Takashige 1992
Yuri Kochiyama: Passion for Justice 1993
Strawberry Fields 1997
Little Murders 1999
Aloha  2000
Lordville 2014

Producer

Strawberry Fields 1997
Yuri Kochiyama: Passion for Justice 1999

Writer

Strawberry Fields 1997

Actress
Robot Stories  2003

Awards
1989 NEA Visual Arts Fellowship
1990 NEA Production Grant
1992 International Documentary Association, Distinguished Achievement Award – History and Memory"
1992 San Francisco International Film Festival, Special Jury Award: New Visions Category -- "History and Memory"
1992 Atlanta Film & Video Festival, Best Experimental Video -- "History and Memory"
1993 NEA Visual Arts Fellowship
1994 NEA Production Grant
1998 Fukuoka Asian Film Festival, Grand Prix – Strawberry Fields''
1992 Rockefeller Media Fellowship
1999 Rockefeller Media Fellowship
2000 New York Foundation for the Arts
2001 Smack Mellon Residency
2003 MacDowell Colony Residency
2015 Pew Fellowship in the Arts

References

Further reading
Rea Tajiri Press
 Women Make Films: History and Memory: For Akiko and Takashige
 Reel New York- Interview with Rea Tajiri
 Film Reviews -- History and Memory directed by Rea Tajiri
 New York Times Company, April 19, 1991
 Rea Tajiri Biography
 Electronic Arts Intermix Rea Tajiri
Chicago Sun Times April 4 1997
LA Times June 4th 1999

External links
 
Rea Tajiri in the Video Data Bank
 Rea Tajiri profile on Women Make Movies site
 Rea Tajiri Fellowships listing on mediaartists.org 
 www.jstor.org/stable/41690098- Feng
 www.jstor.org/stable/40643435- Streamas
 Harvey, Dennis. "Film Reviews: STRAWBERRY FIELDS." Variety (Archive: 1905-2000) Mar 24 1997: 36. ProQuest. Web. 23 Feb. 2018
 Shank, Barry. “Comments on ‘Patriotic Drunk.’" American Studies, vol. 44, no. 1/2, 2003, pp. 114–119. JSTOR, JSTOR, www.jstor.org/stable/40643436
 Kathleen Hulser. The American Historical Review 96, no. 4 (1991): 1142-143. doi:10.2307/2165011
https://tfma.temple.edu/staff-faculty/Rea-Tajiri
Rea Tajiri, www.wmm.com/filmcatalog/makers/fm357.shtml

Artists from Chicago
American documentary filmmakers
American film directors of Japanese descent
Living people
California Institute of the Arts alumni
1958 births
American film directors
American video artists
American women documentary filmmakers
21st-century American women